So Blonde, subtitled Lost in the Caribbean in Spanish and Blonde in Trouble in Russian and Polish, is a point-and-click adventure game released for the PC in  2008. Two spin-off games have been released: So Blonde: Back to the Island in 2010 and Captain Morgane and the Golden Turtle in 2012.

Gameplay

Plot
Sunny Blonde is a 17-year-old who has been spoiled by her rich parents. On a cruise with her parents who are celebrating their wedding anniversary,  the ship is struck by lightning, and she is knocked overboard.

She finds herself stranded on a beach of a remote “Forgotten  Island” in the Caribbean Sea.
She is totally alone and worrying about her nails and messy make-up. To her surprise, her cell phone doesn't work anymore, and when she approaches a lonely boy sitting on a rock, she learns that he can't point her to the nearest hotel or fully furnished mall. 
On the island, time seems to have stopped about two hundred years ago.  When she starts to explore the island, she finds out that it is ruled by pirates and that it seems to be cursed as well.

In this setting, Sunny has to get rid of her spoiled manners and, in time, she will discover what her real nature is.

Development

So Blonde was announced to the public on March 2, 2007 and had taken 14 months of development by the time of release. The game makes use of the OGRE engine.

Release

Reception

Shortly before the release of So Blonde, the script writer of the game, Steve Ince, was nominated for the Writers' Guild of Great Britain 2008 Awards. His script for the PC Adventure game So Blonde was shortlisted in the category "Best Video game Script".

So Blonde garnered generally mixed reviews, and holds an average of 73% on aggregate web site GameRankings.

See also
A Vampyre Story
Runaway 2: The Dream of the Turtle

References

External links
 

2008 video games
Eidos Interactive games
Point-and-click adventure games
Single-player video games
Video games developed in France
Video games set on islands
Video games set in the Caribbean
Video games featuring female protagonists
Windows games
Windows-only games
Wizarbox games
DTP Entertainment games